This is a list of bridges and other crossings of the Puyallup River from Puget Sound upstream to its source, the Puyallup Glacier on Mount Rainier.

Crossings

See also
 
 
 
 List of crossings of the Columbia River

Notes

References

Books

Further reading

External links

Pierce County bridges at uglybridges.com

Puyallup River